Abu Abdullah Ja'far ibn al-Aswad ibn al-Haytham was an Isma'ili da'i born in 268 AH (881/2 CE) in Qayrawan. He is the author of Kitāb al-Munāẓarāt ("The Book of discussions").

References 

Ismaili da'is
880s births
People from Kairouan
10th-century people from the Fatimid Caliphate
Ismaili theologians
Tunisian Muslim theologians
10th-century Ismailis